Jan Witkiewicz Koszczyc (16 March 1881 – 26 October 1958) was a Polish architect and conservator.

He was born in Rudamina (Urdomin) and died in Warsaw.

References

External links 

1881 births
1958 deaths
People from Lazdijai District Municipality
People from Suwałki Governorate
20th-century Polish architects